Vasileios Portosalte (born 20 February 1976) is a Greek sailor. He competed in the 49er event at the 2004 Summer Olympics.

References

External links
 

1976 births
Living people
Greek male sailors (sport)
Olympic sailors of Greece
Sailors at the 2004 Summer Olympics – 49er
Place of birth missing (living people)